Alien vs. Predator: Sand Trap is a comic book series by Mike Kennedy. It was released as a one-shot comic issue published by Dark Horse Comics, on November 27, 2007. This series was included on the Alien vs. Predator: The Ultimate Showdown DVD box set.

Description

References

External links
 

2007 comics debuts
2007 comics endings
Dark Horse Comics titles
Alien vs. Predator (franchise) comics